Rural Vista USD 481 is a public unified school district headquartered in White City, Kansas, United States.  The district includes the communities of Hope, White City, Woodbine, Latimer, Parkerville, Skiddy, Dillon, and nearby rural areas of Dickinson and Morris Counties.

Schools
The school district operates the following schools:
 Hope High School in Hope.
 White City High School in White City.
 Hope Elementary School in Hope.
 White City Elementary School in White City.

See also
 Kansas State Department of Education
 Kansas State High School Activities Association
 List of high schools in Kansas
 List of unified school districts in Kansas

References

External links
 

School districts in Kansas